Chanute Martin Johnson Airport  is a city-owned airport located two miles southwest of Chanute, in Neosho County, Kansas.  It is named for Martin Johnson, of the husband-and-wife explorers Martin and Osa Johnson, although it was Osa and not Martin who was native to Chanute.

Facilities
It has one runway: 18/36 is 4,255 x 75 ft (1,297 x 23 m) asphalt.

In the year ending December 31, 2016 the airport had 1,700 aircraft operations, an average of 5 per day: 99% general aviation and less than 1% military. In March 2022, there were 15 aircraft based at this airport: 13 single-engine and  2 multi-engine.

References

External links

Airports in Kansas
Buildings and structures in Neosho County, Kansas